Everybody Everybody is a compilation album by Brazilian heavy metal band Viper to celebrate the band's 15th anniversary.

Track listing

External links
 Viper official site

References

1999 compilation albums
Viper (band) albums